Herem may refer to:

Herem (censure), expulsion from the Jewish community
Herem (war or property), a belief that any property imperiling Jewish religious life should be destroyed
Herem (priestly gift), an object that is devoted to God

See also
Haram (disambiguation)
Harem (disambiguation)
Ḥ-R-M